is a railway station in Hita, Ōita Prefecture, Japan. It is operated by JR Kyushu and is on the  Kyudai Main Line.

Lines

Layout 
The station consists of an island platform serving two tracks with a siding. The station building is a modern structure but built in traditional Japanese style with a tiled roof. It is unstaffed and serves only as a waiting room. Access to the island platform is by means of a level crossing.

Adjacent stations

Note: Since July 2017, the line after Teruoka has been cut due to a bridge collapse. The connection between Teruoka and Hita is now made by a JR bus service.

History
In a further phase of expansion, the track was extended east with  opening as the eastern terminus on 3 March 1934. Teruoka opened on the same day as an intermediate station on the track. With the privatization of Japanese National Railways (JNR), the successor of JGR, on 1 April 1987, JR Kyushu took over control of the station.

In July 2017, torrential rainfall led to the railway bridge across the Kagetsugawa River about 1 km east of the station being swept away, cutting the line. JR Kyushu said it intended to resume service by the summer of 2018 but later stated that it could be a long time before service is restored.

Passenger statistics
In fiscal 2015, there were a total of 41,755 boarding passengers, giving a daily average of 114 passengers.

See also
 List of railway stations in Japan

References

External links
Teruoka (JR Kyushu)

Railway stations in Ōita Prefecture
Railway stations in Japan opened in 1934